Barnard 150 is a dark nebula visible in Cepheus constellation. It is also known as the Seahorse Nebula due to its shape.

Characteristics 
The dust nebula cover about 1° of angular dimension and it is formed by three dense cores labeled L1082 A, B and C.

See also 
 Barnard Catalogue

References 

Dark nebulae
Cepheus (constellation)